Qareh Guni (also Romanized as Qareh Gūnī, Qara Gunei, and Qareh Gowney; also known as Ghareh Gooni Badostan, Karaguney, and Qareh Gūnīr) is a village in Bedevostan-e Gharbi Rural District, Khvajeh District, Heris County, East Azerbaijan Province, Iran. At the 2006 census, its population was 28, in 9 families.

References 

Populated places in Heris County